Vijay Bahadur Singh is an Indian politician. He was a member of Bahujan Samaj Party, until 2013. He was the Advocate General of Uttar pradesh. In the 2009 election he was elected to the Lok Sabha from the Hamirpur with 25893 votes.

References

External links
Official biographical sketch in Parliament of India website

India MPs 2009–2014
Living people
Indian whistleblowers
Lok Sabha members from Uttar Pradesh
People from Hamirpur district, Uttar Pradesh
Bahujan Samaj Party politicians from Uttar Pradesh
1940 births
Samajwadi Party politicians from Uttar Pradesh